Renton (Scottish Gaelic: An Reantan; Scots: The Renton) is a village in West Dunbartonshire, in the west Central Lowlands of Scotland. In the 2001 National Census it had a population of 2,138.

Renton is particularly famous for the village's association football side. Renton was one of the 11 founder members of the Scottish Football League and winners of the 1885 and 1888 Scottish Cup, producing many famous players.

History 

The Renton takes its name from Cecilia Renton (daughter-in-law of Tobias Smollett) after whom the modern sandstone, 'model' village was named in 1762. Dalquhurn Bleachworks in 1715 and Cordale Printworks in 1770 were responsible for attracting new industrial workers. At the north of the village stood the Place of Bonhill, a residence from 1642, to the South was Dalquhurn House. Two parallel north–south streets, Main Street and Back Street were first joined by Station Street, Stirling Street, Burns Street, Thimble Street, Market Street and Red Row. In late Victorian times, the village extended southwards to Leven Street, Alexander Street and John Street. Further expansion occurred in the 1930s as housing was built in the grounds of Cordale House. In the early 1960s the majority of the sandstone properties in the village were compulsory purchased by Dumbarton County Council, demolished and replaced by Dumbarton County Council with 1960s Brutalist-style concrete houses and flats; the majority of which have been replaced by proper houses, own front & back door, by the Cordale Housing Association.

It has traditionally been a stronghold of radical left-wing politics; during the 1930s it had Communist councillors, Bunger Lamont, never toed the Labour Party line and independent councillors such as Jimmy McKenzie (1960/70s), and since 1999 it has been represented on West Dunbartonshire council by Jim Bollan, at present the Scottish Socialist Party's only councillor.

It lies on the main road, A82 as was, between Alexandria and Dumbarton. Renton railway station is on the line from Glasgow to Balloch. It has a footbridge across the River Leven to the Strathleven Industrial Estate (once a major source of employment), and a minor road, with a steep 33% hill, across Carman Hill to Cardross.

Robert the Bruce's manor house 

Despite a report that appeared in The Observer on Sunday 22 February 2009(1) stating that the buried ruins of the manor house of Robert the Bruce had been found in the Pillanflatt area of Renton, this interpretation has yet to be confirmed. While there is strong Charter evidence to indicate the presence of a manor or hunting lodge belonging to Bruce in the area, this is more likely to have been located in the vicinity of Mains of Cardross, to the south of the Pillanflat, rather than in the area to the north of it. Stone, plaster and mortar are not generally susceptible to scientific dating techniques, and lime mortar was used from the Roman period up to the late 19th or early 20th centuries.

According to Bruce Historian Stuart Smith, a charter dating from 1362 charter states that Robert the Bruce resided between Kings Park of Cardross and the lands of Pillanflatt, bounding the lands of Dalquhurn. This would suggest a site to the south of the Pillanflat, but to the north of Castle Park, in the vicinity of what is now Mains of Cardross.

Modern Times 

In recent times, Renton has seen some major social regeneration most notably, although not restricted to, housing.

Notable residents 
Before Renton existed in its current form Robert the Bruce lived and died at the Manor of Cardross, the exact location of which is uncertain, but may have been near or in what is now Renton, although it was probably in Cardross Parish. The writer Tobias Smollett was born in Dalquhurn House in what is now Renton in 1721 and is commemorated by Smollett Monument in the village', erected by his cousin three years after the author's death in Italy in 1771.

MP and Lord Provost Duncan McLaren was born in Renton, as was MP in, and speaker of, the Canadian House of Commons, James Allison Glen and author Jane Duncan.

Professional footballers born in the village:
 
Andrew Hannah (Born 1864, Only player to captain both Everton FC & Liverpool FC), 

James Kelly (footballer, born 1865, 1st captain of Celtic FC), 

Alex Jackson (footballer born 1905, Huddersfield, Chelsea & Scotland, Scorer of a hatrick in the 5-1 England v Scotland Wembley wizards match March 1928), 

John O'Hare (footballer born 1946 Derby County, Leeds Utd, Nottingham Forest, European Cup winner 1980), 

Andy Duncan (footballer born 1911, Dumbarton, Hull City, Tottenham Hotspur), 

Jack Ashurst (footballer born 1954, Sunderland, Blackpool, Leeds Utd) 

Sir Alex Ferguson (Queens Park, Rangers FC, Dunfermline, St Mirren, Aberdeen FC, Manchester Utd, Scotland, Has strong links to the village, Both his grandfather & father were born in Renton & worked in the shipyard in Dumbarton. The family moved to Linthouse near Govan to gain emploment in the Govan shipyard. 

The boxer Skeets Gallacher (Born 1925, Champ in the Great Britain v USA 1946 Golden gloves tournament, Uncrowned flyweight champion of the world),  Gallacher Way in the village is named after him as he was born there too.

Sport 

When Renton F.C. won the World Cup, the footballing world was in its infancy in 1888, almost exclusively played by Scottish and English clubs. It was a World Cup Championship by default – nevertheless Renton's claim is undisputed. They won the Scottish Cup with a 6-1 thrashing of Cambuslang F.C. Then they humbled English Cup holders West Bromwich Albion, who had prepared in Scotland for two weeks. The score was 4–1 in front of a record 10,000 fans at Hampden Park. Renton endorsed their title with an away win against "The Invincibles" of Preston North End. A "Champion of the World" sign was proudly displayed on the pavilion at Tontine Park. They are one of the few teams to have their name engraved on the Scottish Cup multiple times (2 wins),  They were ahead of their time in training for stamina and strength. Their weapon was Renton's own famous "chicken bree", the ingredients never disclosed but it was probably port wine switched with a couple of eggs administered daily.

Quoiting (pronounced kiteing) was a popular sport amongst the male villagers. Quoiting greens were found in Renton, Alexandria, Hardgate and many Ayrshire villages. They were hurled at a steel pin driven into a  square clay bed, with the common length of the green being . Renton were Scottish Champions in 1949 and 1986. There is a photograph of the victorious 1949 team in Renton Railway Station.

Facilities 

There are several recreational and consumer related facilities in Renton, including a new mini supermarket and healthy living centre, and of course Tom Swans Sweet Shop along with a bakery. A pub closed in June 2019. There is a bowling green and a Freemasons lodge. Wylie Park  (known locally as Tontine Park ) is also used most Saturdays and Sundays for football games. It is home to local youth football team Renton Craigandro. A newly opened Youth Club at the Autism and Aspergers Centre (old nursery). Offering a youth club every Wednesday, 6pm-7:30pm for Primary 1 to 6 and 7:30pm-9pm for 1st, 2nd and 3rd Years at High School.

Footnotes

References

External links

Vision of Britain - Renton, Dunbartonshire

Villages in West Dunbartonshire
Vale of Leven